St. James Park is a public park in Fordham, Bronx, New York City. It is located in between Jerome Avenue and Creston Avenue. New York City purchased the land on September 13, 1897, graded it, and created the park. It is named after the neighboring St. James' Episcopal Church and Parish House. A recreation center, originally for senior citizens, was built in the park in 1974.

References

External links 
 
 

Parks in the Bronx
Urban public parks
Fordham, Bronx